Achryson undulatum is a species of longhorn beetle in the Cerambycinae subfamily. It was described by Hermann Burmeister in 1865. It is known from southern Brazil, Paraguay, Argentina, Uruguay, and Bolivia.

References

Achrysonini
Beetles described in 1865